Philo of Alexandria (20 BCE – 40 CE) was a Hellenistic Jewish philosopher who lived in Alexandria, in the Roman province of Egypt.

Philo may also refer to:

People

Given name
 Philo of Byblos (64–141 CE), writer of grammatical, lexical and historical works in Greek
 Philo of Larissa, Greek philosopher who lived during the 1st century BC
 Philon, Greek architect of the 4th century BC
 Philo (poet), Hellenistic Jewish epic poet quoted in a 2nd-century BC source
 Philo of Byzantium, Greek engineer who lived during the 3rd or 2nd century BC
 Philo the Dialectician (c. 300 BC), Ancient Greek philosopher
 Philo Dibble (1951–2011), American diplomat
 Philo Dunning (1819–1900), American politician
 Philo Farnsworth (1906–1971), American inventor
 Philo C. Fuller (1787–1855), American lawyer and politician
 Philo Hall (1865–1938), American politician
 Philo Miner Lonsbury (1835–1922), Michigan politician and soldier
 Philo McCullough (1893–1981), American actor
 Philo McGiffin (1860–1897), American naval officer
 Philo Nanema (born 10 April 1982), Burkinabé comedian and actress
 Philo A. Orton (1837–1919), American politician and jurist
 Philo Wallace (born 1970), Barbadian cricketer

Surname
 Chris Philo (born 1960), professor of geography at the University of Glasgow
 Mark Philo (1984–2006), English footballer
 Phoebe Philo (born 1973), British fashion designer
 William Philo (1882–1916), British middleweight boxer and Olympic bronze medalist

Other
 The nickname of Phil Lynott (1949–1986), Irish musician and songwriter

Places in the United States
 Philo, California, a census-designated place
 Philo Township, Champaign County, Illinois
 Philo, Illinois, a village
 Philo, Ohio, a village
 Philo High School, Duncan Falls, Ohio
 Philo Power Plant, former power plant in Philo, Ohio

Academics
 Philo (journal), a secular naturalist philosophy journal
 "Philo", a Columbia University term for a member of the Philolexian Society or to the organization
 "Philo", a University of Pennsylvania term for a member of the Philomathean Society or to the organization

Fictional characters
 Philo Vance, an American detective created by S. S. Van Dine in the 1920s and who appears in 12 novels
 Philo, a character from the Fraggle Rock television series
 Philo, a character from the "Weird Al" Yankovic film UHF
 Philo, a character who appears in David Hume's Dialogues Concerning Natural Religion
 Philo Beddoe, the Clint Eastwood character in the film Every Which Way but Loose
 Philomel Hartung of Mana-Khemia: Alchemists of Al-Revis, referred to as Philo
 Philo, a Roman soldier in Shakepeare's play Antony and Cleopatra

Record labels
Philo Records (rhythm & blues), founded in 1946
Philo Records (folk), founded in 1973, a contemporary folk branch of Rounder Records

Other uses
Philo (company), an American internet television company
 , a French automaker, in business from 1912 to 1923
 Philos basilikos, the lowest rank of Aulic titulature in Hellenistic Antiquity
 Philo, a luxury wristwatch line marketed under the Benrus brand.
 "Philos", Greek for 'loving'

See also
 Pseudo-Philo, an anonymous historian in Hebrew whose translated works were compiled with those of Philo of Alexandria
 Philodendron, a plant genus
 Phylo (disambiguation)
 Filo, a Middle Eastern pastry dough